Trois-Pistoles is a city in Quebec, Canada. 

Trois-Pistoles or Trois Pistoles may also refer to:

 Trois Pistoles River in Bas-Saint-Laurent, Quebec
 Trois Pistoles station, a train station in the Quebec city
 Trois Pistoles (ale), an ale brewed by Unibroue

See also
 "Three Pistols", a 1991 song by The Tragically Hip
 Pistole